Pleasure  is the fifth album by Marion Meadows, released in 1998.

Track listing
"January Spring" - 5:33
"Get Away" - 5:21
"Picture This" - 5:27
"Luck Girl" - 5:25
"No Other Love" - 5:07
"Unbreak My Heart" - 4:47
"Gotta Move On" - 5:04
"U. K. Underground" - 5:08
"A Ce Soir" - 5:00
"Child's Play" - 5:18

References

External links
Album at Last.fm

1998 albums
Marion Meadows albums